mojoPortal is an open source, cross-platform, content management system (CMS) for ASP.NET which is written in the C# programming language. mojoCMS supports plugins and has built-in support for, among others, forums, blogs, event calendars, photo galleries, and an e-commerce feature. The project was awarded an Open Source Content Management System Award by Packt in 2007 saying that the "ease of use, set of relevant tools and plugins and also the fact that it is cross platform, made it stand out above the rest". In February 2017, i7MEDIA, LLC, acquired the project from lead developer Joe Audette.

Awards
 eCommerce Developers Perth
 3rd place in the 2009 CMS Awards by Packt Publishing, in the Non-PHP category

Key features

 Works with MS SQL Server, SqlAzure, MySQL, PostgreSQL, and SQLite databases
 Supports multiple sites on one installation and database
 HTML 5 compliant Content Management with support for work flow and approval/publishing process
 Custom Skinning with support for user selectable skins and individual skins per page
 Supports TinyMCE, CKeditor, or XStandard HTML WYSIWYG
 Easily Customizable User Profile System
 Member List
 Flexible Menu system
 Localizable, currently translated into 10 languages
 Passwords encryption
 SSL support for the whole website or per page
 URL re-writing
 Error logging and optional debug logging
 Authenticate against the database, LDAP, Active Directory, Windows NTLM, or OpenID.
 Content Workflow
 Content Versioning
 Content Template System
 Content Style Template System
 Content Widgets
 Built in SEO (Search Engine Optimization)
 301 Redirect Manager
 Integrated Google Analytics

Default modules
 HTML Content
 Blog
 SuperFlexi
 Event Calendar
 Forums
 Contact Form
 Survey
 Poll

References

External links
 mojoPortal website

Free content management systems